Plantage MAVO was a vocationally oriented secondary school for students aged 12–16 (Middelbaar algemeen voortgezet onderwijs) in Beverwijk, the Netherlands. A successor to a prior form of vocational school called an Uitgebreid Lager Onderwijs or ULO, it opened in 1958 as part of the development of a new neighborhood, the "Plantage". At the end of the 1980s, it was amalgamated with other schools, first to form Scholengemeenschap Maerten van Heemskerck and then as part of the formation of a single secondary school for the whole town, Kennemer College. The school building was demolished and apartments built on the site.

References

External links
Plantage MAVO at Schoolbank.nl 

Secondary schools in the Netherlands